Lamane or laman (also laam or lam) means "master of the land" in the Mandingue, Wolof, and Serer languages. The name was also sometimes the title of chiefs or kings of the Serer people of the Senegambia region which includes modern day Senegal and the Gambia. This title was also used by some kings of the Wolof kingdoms. The title is sometimes used interchangeably with the old title Maad. After the Guelowars' migration to the Sine and the foundation of the Kingdom of Sine, "lamane" denotes a provincial chiefs answerable to the King of Sine and Saloum.

Although the later lamanes were always descendants of the Serer village and town founders (the original lamanes), and their families ruled the Kingdoms of Sine, Saloum and Baol etc., the power they previously enjoyed as lamanes  diminished they continued to make up the  land-owning class.  Though their power was somewhat diminished, their economic and political power was intricately linked to Serer custom, Serer history and Serer religion.  As such, they were extremely powerful if not as true kings as guardians of Serer traditions and beliefs and could dethrone a reigning monarch if threatened.

The lamanes were the guardians of Serer religion. They created sanctuaries and shrines in honour of the Pangool (Serer ancestral spirits and Saints).

Some prominent Serer lamanes
Lamane Jegan Joof
Lamane Jaw (or Lamane Diao) – King of Jolof 1285
Lamane Pangha Yaya Sarr – c. 14th century lamane of Sine and an opponent to the Guelowar refugees.
Sayerr Jobe, founder of Serekunda

References

External links
The Seereer Resource Centre, "Seereer Lamans and the Lamanic Era" (2015) [in] The Seereer Resource Centre, URL: http://www.seereer.com/laman

 
Serer history
Serer royalty
Ancient African people